Samuel Gibson Getty (1817 – 15 December 1877) was a Conservative Party politician.  He sat in the House of Commons of the United Kingdom  from 1860 to 1868 as one of the two Members of Parliament (MPs) for Belfast.

References

External links 

1817 births
1877 deaths
Members of the Parliament of the United Kingdom for Belfast constituencies (1801–1922)
Irish Conservative Party MPs
UK MPs 1859–1865
UK MPs 1865–1868